Florida's 28th congressional district is a new district created as a result of the 2020 census. The first candidates ran in the 2022 House elections for a seat in the 118th United States Congress. The district was created during the 2020 redistricting cycle as the successor to the previous 26th district in the 2010s. It includes all of Monroe County, home to the Florida Keys, and many of Miami's outer southwestern suburbs, including all of Homestead, The Hammocks, Kendale Lakes, Tamiami, and others. All three of Florida's national parksthe Everglades, Biscayne, and the Dry Tortugasare also located in this district.

The district's first and current Representative is Republican Carlos Giménez.

Statewide election results

List of members representing the district

Election results

2022

References

28
Constituencies established in 2023
2023 establishments in Florida